This is a list of seasons of Örebro-based Swedish ice hockey club Örebro HK, formerly named HC Örebro 90.

ore